Dominique Larifla (born 6 July 1936 in Petit-Bourg) is a politician from Guadeloupe who served in the French Senate from 1995 to 2004 and the French National Assembly from 1988 to 1993.

References

page on the French Senate website
page on the French National Assembly website

1936 births
Living people
People from Petit-Bourg
Guadeloupean politicians
Socialist Party (France) politicians
Deputies of the 9th National Assembly of the French Fifth Republic
French Senators of the Fifth Republic
Senators of Guadeloupe